Sayers is a small unincorporated community in Bexar County, Texas, United States. It is part of the San Antonio Metropolitan Statistical Area.

History
Sayers was established after the Civil War. A post office was established in Sayers in 1885. 50 people were living in Sayers in 1896 with two general stores and a church. The Adkins post office was moved to Sayers, and the postal area was named Adkins. It lost half of its population in 1940 and had three businesses, which all closed after World War II. The community now has several churches, restaurants, a small grocery store, a gas station, and a cemetery.

Geography

Education
Sayers had its own school in 1896. Today, the community is served by the East Central Independent School District. Salem-Sayers Baptist School also serves the community.

In popular culture
The film Sugarland Express which is based on the true story of Sayers residents was filmed in and around Sayers.

References

Unincorporated communities in Bexar County, Texas
Greater San Antonio
Unincorporated communities in Texas